Znа́meniye (Russian: Зна́мение) or Our Lady of the Sign is an icon in the orans style, dated at the first half of the 12th century. The icon was painted in medieval Novgorod. It is one of the most revered icons of the Russian Orthodox Church and the main holy of Russian North-West. In past the icon was the main icon of the Novgorod Republic and the symbol of Novgorod sovereignty and republicanism due to the event that has glorified the icon.

Description 

The icon symbolizes the pregnancy of the Virgin: it shows Our Lady with hands raised for praying and the figure of the holy infant in her chest in the circle (orans type of icons). The icon is 2-sided: saint Joachim and saint Anne in praying are pictured on the back side. It has a shaft which for an icon indicates the ability to be carried outside.

In the 17th century the paint was refreshed: Macarius, the metropolitan of Moscow, is believed to be the possible executor). The initial ancient paint is retained only in fragments (some of the Virgin’s dress, and the circle around the Jesus). The back side image is absolutely original, in the ancient paint.

History 
The origins of the icon are unknown. The icon is ascribed to be miraculous. The miracle reportedly occurred in 1170, when Novgorod was besieged by the army of Andrei Bogolubsky, the prince of Suzdal. The struggle has become a seminal iconographic theme since.

In 1170 the united army of four Russian kingdoms (duchy of Vladimir, duchy of Smolensk, duchy of Murom and duchy of Polotsk) laid siege to the city. Subsequent events are described in the Novgorodian saga, cited below.

The importance of that victory was hard to overestimate, taking into consideration the fact that a year before the same army of Andrei Bogolubsky and his allies had captured Kiev for the first time in history, aborting the reign of the Novgorodian prince’s father.

The miraculous icon dwelt in the Church of the Transfiguration on Ilyina Street for 186 years afterwards. Later it was moved in a church in honour of the sign on the Holy Virgin, built specially for the icon. The last isn't preserved, as in 1682 it was replaced with the Cathedral of Our Lady of the Sign in Novgorod. In 1992 the icon was moved into the Cathedral of St. Sophia, where it dwells now.

Numerous copies of the icon were well known all around the Russia. Some of them are believed to be miraculous as well. Memory about the miraculous deliverance of Novgorod had been retained in oral tales for a long time.

References 

Veliky Novgorod
Russian icons
12th-century paintings
Paintings of the Madonna and Child